Beatdown Hardwear (BDHW) is a Germany-based hardcore independent record label founded by Toni Grunert in 2005.

The name of the label is a play on the name of the genre "beatdown hardcore", replacing the word "hardcore" with a misspelled variant of the word hardware.

Current artists 

 Born From Pain
 Brutality Will Prevail
 CDC
 
 Cold Hard Truth
 Dagger Threat
 DCA
 Detriment
 Dead End Tragedy
 Dead Man's Chest
 
 Easy Money
 Eisberg
 Enemy Mind
 
 Guilt Trip
 Hardside
 Harm/Shelter
 
 Lawgiver
 Lionheart
 Malevolence
 Mad At The World
 Manu Armata
 
 Negative Self
 No Altars
 No Zodiac
 Optimist
 Pallass
 Ruckus
 
 Sand
 Slope
 These Streets
 The Last Charge
 The Setup
 Thronetorcher
 World of Pain
 Wolfpack
 Whatever It Takes
 
 Worst
 XILE

Former artists 

 45. Stainless
 Awaken Demons
 Circle of Death
 Delusions of Lunacy
 Dos Dias De Sangre
 Give Em Blood
 Last to Remain
 Look My Way
 Red Eyed Devil
 Screamin Silence
 Sun Tzu
 Twitching Tongues
 World Eater
 Xibalba

References

External links 
 Official website
 Beatdown Hardwear on Facebook
 Beatdown Hardwear at Discogs

German record labels
Hardcore record labels